Dumped is a British reality television programme which started on 2 September 2007 and aired nightly until 5 September 2007 on Channel 4. It involved 11 contestants living for three weeks on a rubbish dump next to a landfill site near Croydon in South London. The contestants who "survived" the 21 days and used only what they found on the dump were awarded £20,000 to share equally between them. The working title of the programme was Eco-Challenge. One contestant, Darren Lumsden, voluntarily left the programme on Day 3. The series was promoted with a large publicity campaign, which included advertisements on websites and a concert by the Royal Philharmonic Orchestra. The programme achieved a peak of 2.4 million viewers, although this was marginally less than the number of people watching other channels at the same time. The programme was criticised because it was filmed on an artificial landfill and for its choice of "fame hungry" contestants.

Production and format
Dumped, which was filmed in June 2006, was initially scheduled for Channel 4's Spring 2007 line-up. However, this did not occur and the programme was then postponed until the start the channel's period of "creative renewal", which was established due to the racism controversy that occurred during the fifth series of Celebrity Big Brother in January 2007.

11 participants, who were not initially informed of their task, must live on a purpose-made rubbish dump adjacent to a working landfill site for 21 days after being left equipped only with a sleeping bag, drinking can and one roll of lavatory paper each. Rob Holdway, director of environmental consultancy Giraffe Innovation, presented the programme and set the contestants regular challenges. The participants had to wear Kevlar gloves, protective boots and face masks when working on the real landfill site. Every person working on the programme was given tetanus, polio and hepatitis vaccinations for their safety.

Contestants
The 11 contestants who participated "represented the complete spectrum of public opinion on environmental issues". Potential participants were not told that the programme would involve living on a landfill, but were instead told that they would be part of "a unique eco-challenge". One participant, Darren Lumsden, voluntarily left the programme after just three days, claiming that the experience had taught him nothing, though years later he would turn up on another reality TV show called The Chop (in October 2020).

Pre-series publicity
Described as Channel 4's "biggest marketing campaigns of the year", Dumped was promoted via various methods. Advertisements for the programme appeared on websites such as Yahoo, The Guardian, New Scientist, The Daily Telegraph and MSN. Television adverts, using the 1998 single "Delta Sun Bottleneck Stomp" by Mercury Rev, featured people performing everyday tasks such as bathing whilst on the landfill. Posters featuring the programme's tagline, "Living off the landfill", were displayed across Britain and others appeared on the London Underground. Some bus shelters within London featured posters which were made out of rubbish, and 2 September 2007 edition of The Sunday Times featured a biodegradable bag wrap to promote the programme. Eight members of the London Philharmonic Orchestra performed Land of Hope and Glory on the landfill site that the programme was filmed, using instruments that had been made out of waste.

Episode breakdown

Reaction

Viewing figures
Dumped received relatively low viewing figures for a peak time programme on a terrestrial channel. The first episode of the programme received just 2.4 million viewers, 10% of the audience, compared to the television premiere of The Queen on ITV1 which was watched by an average of 7.9 million people and attracted a 36% audience share. Coming Down the Mountain, also airing at the same time on BBC One, was watched by 4.7 million and a 20% share. The second episode was watched by 1.7 million, compared to the 3.6 million that watched the opening episode of the third series of ITV1's Hell's Kitchen. The penultimate episode was viewed by 1.5 million viewers and had a 7% audience share, while Hell's Kitchen received 3.4 million viewers and a 15% audience share. The final episode of the programme attracted 1.9 million viewers and an audience share of 8%, while 4.2 million viewed Hell's Kitchen, a 19% audience share. Both programmes were beaten in their slot by BBC One's Traffic Cops, which attracted 5.5 million and a 25% share of the audience.

Reviews
Dumped was met with a mixed reaction from critics. James Walton, of The Telegraph, was critical of the programme and its purpose; on Darren's departure, he said: "According to the narrator, this proved that Darren “didn’t understand” the experiment. Another interpretation, of course, would be that he did." The Times criticised the programme for setting the programme in an artificial rubbish dump for health and safety reasons, comparing it to various fakery scandals that had taken place in the programme Blue Peter in the past year. However, Nigel Kendall of the same newspaper called the programme "entertaining" and its contestants "likeable", while Paul Hoggart said that it gets its point across. Website TV Scoop said that the programme was "a great experiment", but did not approve of the inclusion of "fame hungry" participants and compared the programme to the most recent series of Big Brother. The website Hecklerspray gave the programme a negative review, calling the participants "absolute fucking morons", and Orange gave the programme 3 out of 5 stars. Channel 4 controller Julian Bellamy commented on the programme's failure during Edinburgh Television Festival 2008, saying that it "didn't have the human narrative you need" and that it was "a little bit too like other reality shows".

Controversy
An argument started in the camp between Jermaine and Selena on Day 15, which resulted in some participants stating that they felt intimidated by his actions. The programme's producers had to enter the dump and discuss, along with the other members of the group, whether Jermaine should remain on the programme. Jermaine himself offered to voluntarily leave the programme, but the producers and the other participants decided to keep him. This was criticised in some reviews; one of which called Jermaine "a loud mouthed moron".

References

External links
 Dumped at Channel4.com
 

Channel 4 reality television shows
2000s British reality television series
2007 British television series debuts
2007 British television series endings
English-language television shows